Nikanor Dmitrievich Zakhvatayev (26 July 1898 – 15 February 1963) was a Soviet general and army commander.

Biography 
 
Zakhvatayev was born in Gari in what is now Malmyzhsky District, Kirov Oblast. He fought for the Imperial Russian Army in World War I. 
He received the Order of Saint Vladimir, the Order of Saint Anna, the Order of Saint Stanislaus (House of Romanov) and the Cross of St. George. He was a recipient of the Order of Lenin, the Order of the Red Banner, the Order of Suvorov and the Order of Kutuzov.

He commanded the 4th Guards Army from March to June 1945; 
On 28 April 1945, he was awarded the title of Hero of the Soviet Union for successfully leading his troops in the Vienna offensive.
After June 1945, he was transferred to command the 35th Army in the Far East and participated in the Soviet invasion of Manchuria.

References 

1898 births
1963 deaths
People from Kirov Oblast
Russian military personnel of World War I
Soviet military personnel of the Russian Civil War
Soviet military personnel of World War II
Recipients of the Order of Lenin
Recipients of the Order of the Red Banner
Recipients of the Order of Suvorov, 1st class
Recipients of the Order of Kutuzov
Recipients of the Order of St. Vladimir
Recipients of the Order of St. Anna
Recipients of the Order of Saint Stanislaus (Russian)
Recipients of the Cross of St. George
Frunze Military Academy alumni
Military Academy of the General Staff of the Armed Forces of the Soviet Union alumni